The Pratt & Whitney Canada JT15D is a small turbofan engine built by Pratt & Whitney Canada. It was introduced in 1971 at  thrust, and has since undergone a series of upgrades to just over  thrust in the latest versions. It is the primary powerplant for a wide variety of smaller jet aircraft, notably business jets.

Design and development
When it first ran in 1967 the JT15D was rare among turbofan engines in that it uses a centrifugal compressor as its high-pressure stage.

About 70% of the air passing through the fan goes down the bypass duct. The  JT15D-4 and later variants use a "booster" axial stage behind the fan which runs at the same speed as the fan and directs the remaining 30% of the air into the high-pressure compressor, after which it passes into a reverse-flow annular combustor. The hot gases flow through a high-pressure turbine that drives the centrifugal compressor, and a low-pressure turbine that drives the fan and booster.

The engine was first run in August 1967 before being test flown on an Avro Canada CF-100 Canuck in an underslung external test pod.

Variants

JT15D-1The first model was introduced to power the  Cessna Citation I, then known as the Fanjet 500. Deliveries started in 1972, and eventually on 1,417 -1s were delivered.
JT15D-1A
JT15D-1B
The -4 was the primary engine for the Cessna Citation II, and went on to find use on the Mitsubishi Diamond 1A, Aerospatiale Corvette and SIAI-Marchetti S.211. Eventually 2,195 engines of the -4 series were delivered.
JT15D-4A
JT15D-4B
JT15D-4C
JT15D-4D
JT15D-5 Certified in 1983. The first versions delivered  and were used on the Beechjet 400A and Cessna T-47A. Several minor versions were introduced, the -5A for the Cessna Citation V, while the -5B powered the Beechcraft T-1A Jayhawk, the -5C the DASA Ranger 2000 and S-211A.
JT15D-5A
JT15D-5B
JT15D-5C
The -5D is used on the Cessna UC-35A and Cessna Citation Ultra.
JT15D-5F

Applications

 Aérospatiale Corvette
 Alenia Aermacchi M-311
 Boeing Bird of Prey
 Beechcraft Beechjet 400
 Cessna Citation I
 Cessna Citation II
 Cessna Citation V/Ultra
EADS Barracuda
 Hawker 400
 Honda MH02
 Mitsubishi MU-300 Diamond
 Northrop Grumman X-47A Pegasus
 Raytheon T-1 Jayhawk
 Rockwell Ranger 2000
 Scaled Composites 401
 Scaled Composites ARES
 SIAI-Marchetti S.211/Aermacchi S-211
 Sport Jet II
 Stratos 716X

Specifications (JT15D-5D)

References

Notes

Bibliography

 Gunston, Bill. World Encyclopedia of Aero Engines. Cambridge, England. Patrick Stephens Limited, 1989.

External links

 PWC JT15D Product Overview page

1960s turbofan engines
JT15D
Medium-bypass turbofan engines
Centrifugal-flow turbojet engines